Minuscule 544 (in the Gregory-Aland numbering), 557 (in the Scrivener's numbering), ε 337 (in Soden's numbering), is a Greek minuscule manuscript of the New Testament, on parchment. The manuscript has complex contents. Palaeographically it has been assigned to the 13th century.
It was not adapted for liturgical use.

It came from Epeiros and is currently housed at the University of Michigan. It was digitised and is available online.

Description 

The codex contains the text of the four Gospels, on 256 parchment leaves (size ). The text is written in one column per page, 22 lines per page. It is neatly written in minute hand. The style of writing resembles codex 542 (Scrivener's 555).

There is also a division according to the smaller Ammonian Sections (in Mark 235 Sections, the last section in 16:12) in red, (no references to the Eusebian Canons). The  and the Ammonian Sections are often put in wrong places. There are no lectionary markings at the margin for liturgical use.

The decorated head-pieces stand at the beginning of each Gospel. It does not have lectionary markings at the margin (for liturgical use). The nomina sacra are contracted in usual way.

 Errors

Errors of iotacism (especially ει or ι for η, ο for ω, and vice versa) are rare in the first two Gospels, but more frequent afterwards.

The omissions by "homoioteleuton" (the same endings) are frequent (e.g. Matthew 10:37; Mark 9:43-46; 10:27.42; 12:39; 14:19; 15:14; Luke 10:27; John 3:31; 4:5; 5:32; 6:11.32.42; 8:14; 9:7; 12:34; 13:34; 14:17; 17:21).

N εφελκυστικον is very common, and though the punctuation is accurate, the sign of interrogation never occurs.

This copy was transcribed from an older copy which was defective in Luke. It has an unusual number of variations from the ordinary text, though none of the first rate of importance.

Text 

Hermann von Soden classified the Greek text of the codex to the group Ia. Aland did not place it in any Category.
According to the Claremont Profile Method it has an eclectic text. In Luke 1 it represents Πa, in Luke 10 mixed Byzantine text, and in Luke 20 - Kx.

 Textual variants

 Matthew 2:19 — εν Αιγυπτω ] omitted
 Matthew 12:40 — καρδια ] κοιλια
 Matthew 16:21 — απο ] παρα
 Matthew 17:22 — ανθρωπων ] ανθρωπων αμαρτωλων
 Matthew 18:25 — ακρασιας ] αδικιας
 Matthew 18:28 — ανομιας ] αδικιας
 Mark 1:2 — εν τω ησαια τω προφητη ] εν βιβλω λογων ησαιου του προφητου
 Mark 8:14 — οπου ου δει ] εν τοπω αγνω
 Mark 14:3 — πιστικης ] μυστικης
 Mark 15:8 — καθως αει εποιει αυτοις ] τον βαραββαν (similar to Θ 565, and 700)
 Luke 1:48 — της δουλης ] του δουλου
 Luke 1:48 — κατα το ρημα σου ] omitted
 Luke 3:25 — του Μααθ του Ματταθιου ] omitted
 John 16:13 — το πνα της αληθειας ] omitted
 John 19:38 — του ιυ ] του κυ

History 
 Location

Of the history of the codex 544 nothing is known until the year 1864, when it was in the possession of a dealer at Janina in Epeiros. It was then purchased from him by a representative of Baroness Burdett-Coutts (1814–1906), a philanthropist, along with other Greek manuscripts (among them codices 532-546). They were transported to England in 1870-1871.

The manuscript was presented by Burdett-Coutts to Sir Roger Cholmely's School, and was housed at the Highgate (Burdett-Coutts III. 9), in London. In 1922 it was acquired for the University of Michigan. It is currently housed at the University of Michigan (Ms. 25) in Ann Arbor.

 Examination
It was added to the list of the New Testament manuscripts by F. H. A. Scrivener (557) and C. R. Gregory (544). Gregory saw it in 1883.

Scrivener examined, described and collated its text. His collation was edited posthumous in Adversaria critica sacra in 1893. It is rarely cited in the critical editions of the Greek New Testament.

Gallery

See also 

 List of New Testament minuscules
 Biblical manuscript
 Textual criticism

References

Further reading 

  (as p)
 Kenneth W. Clark, A Descriptive Catalogue of Greek New Testament Manuscripts in America (Chicago, 1937), pp. 297–298.
 E. Colwell, The Four Gospels of Karahissar (Chicago 1936), vol. I, pp. 9. 204 ff.

External links 

 Images of the minuscule 544 at the CSNTM

Greek New Testament minuscules
13th-century biblical manuscripts